Scars From Falling Down is a studio album by Steel Pole Bath Tub, released in 1995 through Slash Records.

"Twist" was released as the album's single, accompanied by a video. Slash dropped the band after the release of the album, rejecting the idea of a follow-up album composed of experimental Cars covers.

Critical reception
Trouser Press wrote: "The intriguingly straightforward Scars From Falling Down relegates the band’s battery of samples to subordinate status, a state of affairs that enhances [Mike] Morasky’s fractured-but-judicious riffing while doing little to protect the air of mystery that’s one of Steel Pole’s chief assets." The Spokesman-Review called the album "one of the year's best major label releases," writing that "SPBT thrashes, it forges impenetrable walls of sound and noise, it floods its music with grating dissonance and, at times, it dismembers rock ‘n’ roll into an unrecognizable mess." CMJ New Music Monthly wrote that "this use of chaos as order finds precedent in tightly-wound groups like Big Black and Gang of Four." Spin called it "noise rock to the nth degree."

Track listing

Personnel 
Adapted from the Scars From Falling Down liner notes.

Steel Pole Bath Tub
Dale Flattum – bass guitar, vocals
Mike Morasky – guitar, vocals
Darren Morey (as D.K. Mor-X) – drums, vocals
Additional musicians
Yoo – guitar (2)

Production and additional personnel
Eric Holland – engineering, mixing (2, 4, 6 – 11)
George Horn – mastering
Gary Panter – cover art, illustrations
Ed Stasium – mixing (1, 3, 5), maracas (1)
Steel Pole Bath Tub – production
Jan Tuuri – photography

Release history

References

External links 
 

1995 albums
Slash Records albums
Steel Pole Bath Tub albums